Scopula coniargyris is a moth of the family Geometridae. It was described by Prout in 1932. It is found in Katanga province of the Democratic Republic of the Congo.

References

Moths described in 1932
Moths of Africa
Insects of the Democratic Republic of the Congo
coniargyris
Taxa named by Louis Beethoven Prout
Endemic fauna of the Democratic Republic of the Congo